Michael Bryant (born April 2, 1995) is an American soccer player who plays as a defensive midfielder or defender for Detroit City in the USL Championship.

Career

College & Amateur
Bryant played college soccer at Elmira College in 2013, where he played three seasons for the Soaring Eagles – missing the 2014 season. In 2017, Bryant transferred to Northwest Nazarene University in Idaho to play his final college season.

Professional
Following college, Bryant captained  NPSL side Orange County FC in 2017, 2018 and 2019.

In September 2019, Bryant signed for NISA side California United Strikers ahead of the league's inaugural season. He appeared in six of the team's regular season games during the Fall 2019 season and scored his first goal on October 20 against San Diego 1904 FC. In the West Coast Championship against Los Angeles Force on November 10, Bryant scored the game tying goal 86th minute to send the game to overtime which United eventually won in a penalty kick shootout.

In February 2022, Bryant signed with USL Championship side Detroit City FC.

Career statistics

References

External links
 Profile at Elmira College
 Profile at NNU
 California United profile

1995 births
Living people
American soccer players
Association football forwards
Soccer players from California
National Premier Soccer League players
California United Strikers FC players
National Independent Soccer Association players
Sportspeople from Orange County, California
Elmira Eagles men's soccer players
Northwest Nazarene University alumni
Association football midfielders
Sportspeople from Lake Forest, California
Detroit City FC players